Hofmeister is a Helles (pale lager beer) with 5% alcohol by volume distributed in Great Britain.

Brewing 
Hofmeister is brewed in Bavaria, Germany according to the purity regulations within the national Reinheitsgebot. This is a traditional brewing method which dates back to 1516. Beers brewed with this method only contain barley, hops, and water.

History 
From the 1980s to 2003, Hofmeister was a 3.2% alcohol by volume pale lager produced by Scottish & Newcastle (later Scottish Courage). On 17 October 2007, Heineken International and Carlsberg jointly announced that they were considering forming a consortium to bid for and acquire the total capitalisation of Scottish & Newcastle, including the Hofmeister brand.

In 2016, Spencer Chambers and Richard Longhurst acquired Hofmeister from Heineken. The beer relaunched in October 2016 with new branding and a revised recipe.

In 2017, Hofmeister won the Best Lager award at the International Wine & Spirits Competition (IWSC), becoming the first lager to be given five stars at the awards.

Production 
Since 2016, Hofmeister has been brewed by Schweiger, a German brewery located in Markt Schwaben near the Ebersberger Forest in Bavaria.

Hofmeister uses spring water from Schweiger's well, as well as locally grown barley and hops from the Hallertau region. The beer is slow brewed and light golden blonde in colour, with low carbonation. The product is imported from Bavaria for sale in the U.K.

Advertising 
The brand was marketed in the 1980s with the slogan "Follow the Bear" and an advertising campaign featuring a bear, George, with a shiny, yellow jacket and a pork pie hat. The first batch of the adverts in 1983 was the final directorial work of film director Orson Welles.

References

External links 
 Official website

Beer brands of the United Kingdom
Beer in the United Kingdom